Fouling communities are communities of organisms found on artificial surfaces like the sides of docks, marinas, harbors, and boats. Settlement panels made from a variety of substances have been used to monitor settlement patterns and to examine several community processes (e.g., succession, recruitment, predation, competition, and invasion resistance). These communities are characterized by the presence of a variety of sessile organisms including ascidians, bryozoans, mussels, tube building polychaetes, sea anemones, sponges, barnacles, and more. Common predators on and around fouling communities include small crabs, starfish, fish, limpets, chitons, other gastropods, and a variety of worms.

Ecology 
Fouling communities follow a distinct succession pattern in a natural environment.

Environmental impact

Positive impacts 
Fouling communities are a part of a healthy aquatic system.

Fouling communities can help test the ecological effectiveness of artificial coral reefs.
 
They can also improve water clarity when organisms in the fouling community are filter feeders.

Negative impacts 
Fouling communities can have a negative economic impact on humans, such as by damaging the bottom of boats.

It can, when attached to the bottoms of boats, bring invasive species to locations where there use to be none.

Research history 
Fouling communities were highlighted particularly in the literature of marine ecology as a potential example of alternate stable states through the work of John Sutherland in the 1970s at Duke University, although this was later called into question by Connell and Sousa.

See also 

 Biofouling
 Ecological succession
 Didemnum vexillum

References

External links 

http://research.ncl.ac.uk/biofouling/ is the Newcastle University barnacle and biofouling information site.
http://www.imo.org/en/OurWork/Environment/Biofouling/Pages/default.aspx is the International Maritime Organization information about biofouling which includes a comprehensive list of invasive species in the fouling community.
https://darchive.mblwhoilibrary.org/bitstream/handle/1912/191/chapter%203.pdf?sequence=11
https://pdxscholar.library.pdx.edu/cgi/viewcontent.cgi?article=4896&context=open_access_etds

Aquatic ecology
Fouling